Athanasios Nanopoulos (1911 – March 1992) was a Greek fencer. He competed in five events at the 1948 Summer Olympics.

References

1911 births
1992 deaths
Greek male fencers
Olympic fencers of Greece
Fencers at the 1948 Summer Olympics